2-Chlorobenzoic acid is an organic compound with the formula ClC6H4CO2H.  It is one of three isomeric chlorobenzoic acids, the one that is the strongest acid.  This white solid is used as a precursor to a variety of drugs, food additives, and dyes.

Synthesis and reactions
It is prepared by the oxidation of 2-chlorotoluene.  The laboratory scale reaction employs potassium permanganate.  Alternatively it arises by the hydrolysis of α,α,α-trichloro-2-toluene.

The chloride is readily replaced by ammonia to 2-aminobenzoic acid.  Similarly, the chloride is displaced by diphenylphosphide, leading to 2-diphenylphosphinobenzoic acid.

At elevated temperature it decarboxylates.

References

Benzoic acids
Chlorobenzenes